Lewis Mandall, known professionally as Ginny Lemon, is a drag performer and recording artist best known for competing on the second series of RuPaul's Drag Race UK. They are known for their alternative and highly campy drag.

Education
Ginny studied at the University of Worcester, and has said they were "hounded out of a job for being gay" whilst working at the university.

Career
Ginny has appeared at Birmingham's SHOUT Festival of Queer Arts and Culture. They appeared on The X Factor in 2017.

While competing on RuPaul's Drag Race UK, Ginny Lemon eliminated themself from the competition in a lip sync round with fellow competitor Sister Sister. They have since said  they felt uncomfortable with some of the judges' comments, arguing that RuPaul and Michelle Visage did not understand British humour, and pushed Ginny towards a female-orientated concept of glamour. Ginny Lemon also criticised RuPaul's emotional outburst on the show, where RuPaul criticised Joe Black's outfit (which occurred after Ginny had left), tweeting: "Screaming and swearing at desperate out of work queens for being too regional and unable to afford costumes after 7 months of jobless despair... Nah babz I’m better off at home fank u very much". In February 2022, Lemon embarked on RuPaul's Drag Race UK: The Official Tour alongside the entire cast of the second series of RuPaul's Drag Race UK, in association with World of Wonder and promoter Voss Events.

In January 2022, Lemon appeared alongside fellow cast member and friend Sister Sister on series 7 of E4's Celebrity Coach Trip, joining fellow celebrity travellers in Portugal like Matt Richardson, Honey G, Paul Danan, The Honeyz and Birds of a Feather stars Linda Robson and Lesley Joseph.

In July 2022, Lemon appeared at the opening ceremony of the 2022 Commonwealth Games, performing a musical act in a large lemon hot air balloon wearing a steampunk/pirate outfit.

Personal life
Ginny is non-binary. A discussion with fellow non-binary Drag Race competitor Bimini Bon-Boulash was credited with helping other non-binary people to come out.

Filmography

Television
 The X Factor (2017)
 RuPaul's Drag Race UK (2021)
 Celebrity Coach Trip (2022)

Music videos

Discography
Studio albums
Greatest Pips (2021)
Tonic (2022)

Singles
"I'm So Offended" (2021)
"I Am Over My Overdraft" (2021)
"Woolworths Sneaky Butchers" (2021)

Stage

References

Year of birth missing (living people)
Living people
20th-century LGBT people
21st-century LGBT people
Alumni of the University of Worcester
British LGBT musicians
English comedy musicians
English drag queens
Gay entertainers
Musicians from Worcester, England
Non-binary drag performers
Non-binary musicians
RuPaul's Drag Race UK contestants